Ryan Abadir (born November 25, 1992), better known as FREAKAZOiD, is an American retired Counter-Strike: Global Offensive player. He has played with teams such as Cloud9 and Echo Fox. Abadir was the last player under contract with Echo Fox, which ended in January 2018.

Career

Counter-Strike
Abadir began his professional Counter-Strike career in 2010 with team Area 51 Gaming. From 2010 to 2012, he competed with teams Swole Patrol and Netcode Illuminati. In 2012, he signed with Team Dynamic.

Counter-Strike: Global Offensive
Abadir transitioned to playing Counter-Strike: Global Offensive (CS:GO) with Team Dynamic in July 2012.

Abadir joined Cloud9 on April 29, 2015, along with Tyler "Skadoodle" Latham. On July 9–12 C9 played at ESWC 2015 and finished 2nd behind Natus Vincere.

In February 2016 he was deducted a month's pay and attended an anti-bullying seminar after he was caught incorrectly treating Team Liquid player Oleksandr "s1mple" Kostylev during a FACEIT Pro League online match.

Abadir was dropped from the C9 roster on April 13, 2016. On April 26 he was announced was a stand in Splyce for Abraham "abE" Fazli and got 7-8t at DreamHack Austin 2016.

On May 31, 2016, Abadir joined Echo Fox, reuniting with former C9 teammate Sean "sgares" Gares.

In May 2020, Abadir announced his retirement from CS:GO to pursue a career in Valorant.

References

American esports players
People from San Diego
Counter-Strike players
Splyce players
Echo Fox players
Living people
Cloud9 (esports) players
Twitch (service) streamers
1992 births